In Norse mythology, Vingólf is one of the buildings of the gods. It is described as the hall or hörgr of the goddesses and also as a place where righteous men and those slain in battle go after death. It is mentioned in the Prose Edda, Gylfaginning 3 and in the enigmatic poem Hrafnagaldur Óðins.

The Prose Edda

Vingólf is mentioned three times in the Gylfaginning section of Snorri Sturluson's Prose Edda.

The three mentions of Vingólf seem somewhat contradictory. In the first instance it appears as an alternative name for Gimlé, a paradise where righteous people go after death. In the second instance it is the hall or hörgr of the goddesses. In the third instance it is a residence for those slain in battle.

The name does not occur in Eddaic or skaldic poetry.

Hrafnagaldur Óðins

The enigmatic Hrafnagaldur Óðins, a young mythological poem composed in the Eddic style, mentions Vingólf in one of its strophes.

The context is enigmatic but Vingólf seems to be a place where the Æsir have gathered for an ale feasts. The significance of this mention hinges on the interpretation of Hrafnagaldur Óðins as a whole.

Vingólf's name

The name Vingólf is usually thought to be composed of vinr (friend) and gólf (floor, hall) and mean something like "pleasant hall". Alternatively the name could be read Víngólf and the meaning would be "wine hall".

Uppsalabók, one of the four main manuscripts of the Prose Edda, has the variant reading Vindglóð seemingly meaning "wind ember" but most variant readings which occur only in that manuscript are thought to be corrupted.

References

 Ásgeir Blöndal Magnússon (1989). Íslensk orðsifjabók. Reykjavík: Orðabók Háskólans.
 Brodeur, Arthur Gilchrist (transl.) (1916). The Prose Edda by Snorri Sturluson. New York: The American-Scandinavian Foundation. Available online
 Eysteinn Björnsson (ed.). Snorra-Edda: Formáli & Gylfaginning : Textar fjögurra meginhandrita. 2005. http://www.hi.is/~eybjorn/gg/
 Eysteinn Björnsson (ed. & tr.) (2002). Hrafnagaldur Óðins : Forspjallsljóð.  http://www.hi.is/~eybjorn/ugm/hrg/hrg.html
 Jónsson, Finnur (1931). Lexicon Poeticum. København: S. L. Møllers Bogtrykkeri.
 Simek, Rudolf. Dictionary of Northern Mythology. 1993. Trans. Angela Hall. Cambridge: D. S. Brewer. . New edition 2000, .
 Thorpe, Benjamin (tr.) (1866). Edda Sæmundar Hinns Froða : The Edda Of Sæmund The Learned. (2 vols.) London: Trübner & Co. Available online

Further reading

In the entry for Vingólf in the Dictionary of Northern Mythology, Rudolf Simek lists the following articles.

 W. Braune (1889). "Vingólf". Beiträge zur Geschichte der deutschen Sprache und Literatur 14.
 F. Jónsson (1890). "Vingólf". Arkiv för nordisk Filologi 6.
 F. Kauffmann (1892). "Vingólf". Zeitschrift für deutsches Altertum 36.

External links
Artist's conception of Vingólf
Artist's conception of Vingólf at night

Locations in Norse mythology
Conceptions of heaven